Sulemanki Headworks is a headworks on the River Sutlej near Okara, in the Punjab province of Pakistan.

Sulemanki Headworks is used for irrigation and flood control.

Sulemanki Headworks is part of the Sutlej Valley Project. Jointly developed at the behest of the Nawab of Bahawalpur, Amir Sadiq Mohammed Khan V and the British Government, it was opened on 12 April 1926. It was an irrigation scheme to develop the neighbouring areas. 

In 1961, To settle the border, India transferred 12 villages to Pakistan near Sulemanki Headworks in exchange for Hussainiwala village.

More specifically, the construction of the Pakpattan Canal took place in British Punjab in 1925 to on the right bank of the Sulemanki Headworks. This was undertaken to develop the Nilli bar colony in the south of Punjab. After the partition of British India, the left bank side of the Sulemanki Headworks became part of India which was later in 1961 transferred to Pakistan in exchange for right bank area of Hussainiwala headworks.

From here originate three major canals which supply irrigation water to a large area in Southern Punjab and the Bahawalnagar district. The Upper Pakpattan Canal arises from its right bank and two canals arise from the left. The canals on the left bank are Fordwah and Eastern Sadiqia Canal. The latter canal runs along the Pakistan-India border. After  at Jalwala headworks, Eastern Sadiqia Canal trifurcates into Sirajwah distributary, Malik Branch Canal and Hakara Branch Canal. Hakara branch runs in a southwesterly direction for another  and is at few places it is a few meters from the Indian border. According to Pakistan army it provides a major defensive landmark against any possible Indian intrusion. Therefore, it is of a significant strategic importance.

About  upriver from the Sulemanki Headworks the Baloki-Sulemanki Link Canal has its outfall connecting the Ravi River to the Sutlej River and thus offsetting the loss of water to India as agreed upon in Indus Basin Water Treaty of 1960. According to that treaty, three Eastern rivers, Ravi, Sutlej and Beas are allocated for the exclusive use of India before they enter Pakistan.

In accordance with the popularity of Retreat Ceremony at other Indo-Pakistan border crossings such as at Wagah and Hussainiwala near Lahore, a smaller ceremony also takes place here at the check point Sadki by Pakistan Rangers and Indian Border Security Force. It attracts a sizable number of tourists on both sides.

In fact the small hilltop Pakistani check point of Sadki was transferred to the Pakistani control by India by a treaty signed on January 17, 1961. Pakistan needed to have border adjustments for efficient operation of the Headworks which was not possible otherwise. In return Pakistan ceded a part of its territory to India. That territory in itself is noteworthy for the memorial constructed in memory of Bhaghat Singh, a freedom fighter who was executed by the colonial British government.

Major Shabbir Sharif, a Pakistani officer, the elder brother of General Raheel Sharif, former Chief of Pakistan Army Staff was martyred in Indo-Pakistani War of 1971 in this border region. He was posthumously awarded Nishan-Haider, the highest Pakistani military honor for bravery.

See also
 List of barrages and headworks in Pakistan
 List of dams and reservoirs in Pakistan

References

Irrigation in Pakistan
Dams on the Sutlej River
Dams in Pakistan